Gambling is an activity undertaken by many Australians. Over 80% of Australian adults engage in gambling of some kind, which is the highest rate of gambling in the world. This number includes some 4% of the adult population who play the pokies once a week, accounting for some 62% of locals' annual gambling spend.

Gambling is a significant public health issue, with around 80,000 to 160,000 (or 0.5 - 1.0%) of Australian adults experiencing significant problems from gambling and a further 250,000 to 350,000 (or 1.4 - 2.1% of adults) experiencing moderate risks that may make them vulnerable to problem gambling.

Revenue
In 2015–16, gambling revenue made up 7.7% of state and territory taxation revenue. The rate was lowest in Western Australia (2.5%) and highest in the Northern Territory (12.0%). Gambling revenue made up 2.5% of total state revenue when other revenue sources were taken into account. The rate was lowest in WA (0.9%) and highest in Victoria (3.2%). Gambling revenue as a portion of state taxation revenue has fallen for all states and territories between 2006–07 and 2015–16.

Total Australian gambling revenue in 2008-09 was just over $19 billion and the share of household consumption was 3.1%. According to the Queensland Government the total Australian gambling market was worth over $25 billion in 2019. During the pandemic in 2020 and 2021 the proportion of online gamblers rose to 78% while half of the Australians gamble on a regular basis.

New South Wales
New South Wales has a long history of gambling; Australia's first official horse racing meeting occurred in 1810 at Hyde Park in Sydney; the first official Australian lottery occurred in 1881 at the Sydney Cup; and registered clubs operated the first legal poker machines in Australia from 1956.

There are approximately 95,800 "pokies" in NSW, a state total beaten only by Nevada, which operated 181,109 gambling machines in 2014.

Between 1 December 2017 to 31 May 2018 NSW Clubs made a net profit of $1,945,161,625 and hotels made a net profit of $1,169,040,731 from pokies alone.

Fairfield
Fairfield had the highest poker machine revenue in the state for 2013, generating $298 million in clubs and $93 million in pubs, from the start of the year to August. This figure is $123 million greater than the combined total of profits generated from poker machines in the City of Sydney.

Hunter Region
From January to March 2013 poker machines in the Hunter region had a turn over of $4.5 billion, showing an increase of $500 million since 2010. Daily figures show a spend of $12.5 million, working out to be $8682 per minute. The Office of Liquor Gaming and Racing found that Newcastle was the Hunter Regions most profitable location with the 3206 poker machines averaging $44,963 each.
The top five most profitable clubs for gaming revenue in the Hunter region in 2010 were: 
1. Western Suburbs Leagues Club (Wests), New Lambton
2. Wests (formerly Club Phoenix), Mayfield
3. Wallsend RSL & Community Club, Wallsend
4. Belmont 16 Foot Sailing Club, Belmont
5. Cardiff Panthers, Cardiff
The top five most profitable hotels for gaming revenue in the Hunter region in 2010 were.
1. The George Tavern, East Maitland
2. Bay Hotel Motel, Bonnells Bay
3. Hotel Jesmond, Jesmond
4. The Lake Macquarie Tavern, Mount Hutton
5. Warners Bay Hotel, Warners Bay

Central Coast Region
According to the latest figures from Liquor and Gaming NSW there are 4,046 poker machines in 39 clubs on the Central Coast, and 626 poker machines in 29 hotels; making a total of 4,672 poker machines on the Central Coast. That means 2.37% of the total number of poker machines in Australia are on the NSW Central Coast.

Gosford has approximately 1928 pokies, spread across 37 venues. That is the equivalent of one poker machine for every 71 adults.  In 2010–11, venues in Gosford made approximately $95,865,000 in profit from pokies. That equates to $700 for each adult member of Gosford's population.

Wyong has approximately 2608 pokies, spread across 35 venues. That is the equivalent of one poker machine for every 47 adults. In 2010–11, venues in Wyong made approximately $123,159,000 in profit from pokies. That equates to $1,000 for each adult member of Wyong's population.

The Central Coast has a higher prevalence of problem gambling than the NSW average. Young men between the ages of 18-24 living on the Central Coast are the biggest players of poker machines in NSW and are the highest risk group for problem gambling.

In 2008 Central Coast Gambling Help carried out a survey of 200 young people aged from 13-24 and found:
96% of people from 18-24 had gambled for money or possessions
62% of those under 14 years old and 77% of those aged up to 17 had gambled for money or items, including mobile phones and MP3 players
25.5% of 14- to 17-year-olds and 55% of 18- to 24-year-olds had lost more than they had intended
and 6% under 18 had played a poker machine

Regulatory authorities
Since the introduction of new gambling services, including online gambling, the Commonwealth has taken a more active role in the regulation of gambling, but the Australian gambling industry is also regulated by State and Territory authorities:
Australian Capital Territory - ACT Gambling and Racing Commission
New South Wales - Liquor and Gaming NSW
Northern Territory - Licensing Commission
Queensland - Office of Liquor and Gaming Regulation
South Australia - Independent Gambling Authority
Tasmania - Tasmanian Gaming Commission
Victoria - Victorian Commission for Gambling and Liquor Regulation
Western Australia - Department of Racing, Gaming and Liquor

Key legislation
Traditionally gambling has been legislated at a state and territory level rather than by the Commonwealth:

Australian Capital Territory
 Betting (ACTTAB Limited) Act 1964
 Casino Control Act 2006
 Gaming Machine Act 2004
 Interactive Gambling Act 1998
 Lotteries Act 1964
 Pool Betting Act 1964
 Race and Sports Bookmaking Act 2001
 Racing Act 1999
 Unlawful Gambling
New South Wales
 Betting Tax Act 2001
 Casino Control Act 1992
 Charitable Fundraising Act 1991
 Gambling (Two-Up) Act 1998
 Gaming and Liquor Administration Act 2007
 Gaming Machines Act 2001
 Gaming Machines Tax Act 2001
 Liquor Act 2007
 Lotteries and Art Unions Act 1901
 Public Lotteries Act 1996
 Racing Administration Act 1998
 Registered Clubs Act 1976
 Totalizator Act 1997
 Unlawful Gambling Act 1998.
Northern Territory
 Gaming Control Act 2005;
 Gaming Machine Act 2005;
 Northern Territory Licensing Commission Act 2001;
 Racing and Betting Act 2004;
 Soccer Football Pools Act 2004;
 Totalisator Licensing and Regulation Act 2004; and
 Unlawful Betting Act 2004.
Queensland
 Brisbane Casino Agreement Act 1992
 Breakwater Island Casino Agreement Act 1984
 Cairns Casino Agreement Act 1993
 Casino Control Act 1982
 Charitable and Non-Profit Gaming Act 1999
 Gaming Machine Act 1991
 Interactive Gambling (Player Protection) Act 1998
 Jupiters Casino Agreement Act 1983
 Keno Act 1996
 Lotteries Act 1997
 Wagering Act 1998.
South Australia
 Authorised Betting Operations Act 2000
 Casino Act 1997
 Gaming Machines Act 1992
 Lottery and Gaming Act 1936
 State Lotteries Act 1966
Tasmania
 Gaming Control Act 1993
 TT-Line Gaming Act 1993
Victoria
 Casino control Act
 Casino (Management Agreement) Act 1993
 Gambling Regulation Act 2003.
Western Australia
 Betting Control Act 1954
 Bookmakers Betting Levy Act 1954
 Casino (Burswood Island) Agreement Act 1985
 Casino Control Act 1984
 Gaming and Betting (Contracts and Securities) Act 1985
 Gaming and Wagering Commission Act 1987
 Gaming and Wagering Commission (Continuing Lotteries Levy) Act 2000
 Racing and Wagering Western Australia Act 2003
 Racing and Wagering Western Australia Tax Act 2003
 Racing Restriction Act 2003
 Racing Bets Levy Act 2009

Online gambling
The Interactive Gambling Act (2001) was passed by the Australian Commonwealth Parliament on 28 June 2001. It received assent on 11 July 2001

The Act is targeted at online gambling operators, making it an offense for them to offer 'real-money' online interactive gambling to residents of Australia. It also makes it illegal for online gambling operators to advertise 'real-money' interactive gambling services (such as online poker and online casinos) to Australian citizens.
That being said, the amount spent on online gaming by Australians reached some $800 million by 2010, according to the official 2010 Productivity Report of the Australian Government.

Accessing and using the interactive gambling services is not an offence. It is also allowed to companies based in Australia to offer their gambling services to gamblers located outside Australia with the exception of those countries that were called 'designated countries' like Australia.

Taxation laws on gambling in Australia 
Gamblers' winnings in Australia are not taxed. There are 3 main reasons for that:
Gambling is not considered a profession, it's treated as a hobby or recreational activity.
The Australian government views gains from gambling activities not as income, but as a result of good luck. Even if someone wins big, they also lose a lot in other gambling sessions.
The government taxes gambling operators instead.

Taxation of gambling operators in Australia differs from state to state and different gambling services are taxed in a different way. There are taxes on the turnover, on player loss and net profit. As gambling operators need to obtain a license to offer their services, certain fees must also be paid at this stage of gambling business development.

The use of different tax rates and tax bases makes it difficult to compare taxes across states. For example, the ACT's keno tax rate of 2.53% of turnover is equivalent to a tax rate on gross profits of 10.12%.

Tax rates (2015–16)

See also 
Federal Hotels
Australian Taxation Office
Wrest Point Hotel Casino
Gambling

References